Osvel Caballero is a Cuban boxer. He competed at the 2021 AIBA World Boxing Championships, winning the gold medal in the featherweight division.

Professional boxing career
Caballero made his professional debut against Jhosman Reyes Gutierrez on 20 May 2022. He won the fight by a fourth-round knockout. He would notch two more victories that year, a second-round technical knockout of Pedro Pineda on 29 July and a unanimous decision against Gerson Escobar Romero on 30 October 2022.

Professional boxing record

References

External links 

Living people
Year of birth missing (living people)
Place of birth missing (living people)
Cuban male boxers
Featherweight boxers
AIBA World Boxing Championships medalists
Pan American Games gold medalists for Cuba
Pan American Games medalists in boxing
Boxers at the 2019 Pan American Games
Medalists at the 2019 Pan American Games
21st-century Cuban people